Milton may refer to:

Names 

 Milton (surname), a surname (and list of people with that surname)
 John Milton (1608–1674), English poet
 Milton (given name)
 Milton Friedman (1912–2006), Nobel laureate in Economics, author of Free to Choose

Places

Australia 
 Milton, New South Wales
 Milton, Queensland, a suburb of Brisbane
 Milton Courts, a tennis centre
 Milton House, Milton, a heritage-listed house
 Milton railway station, Brisbane
 Milton Reach, a reach of the Brisbane River
 Milton Road, an arterial road in Brisbane

Canada 
 Milton, Newfoundland and Labrador
 Milton, Nova Scotia in the Region of Queens Municipality
 Milton, Ontario
 Milton line, a commuter train line
 Milton GO Station
 Milton (electoral district), Ontario
 Milton (provincial electoral district), Ontario
 Beaverton, Ontario a community in Durham Region and renamed as Beaverton in 1835
 Rural Municipality of Milton No. 292, Saskatchewan

New Zealand 
 Milton, New Zealand

United Kingdom

England 
 Milton, Cambridgeshire, a village north of Cambridge
 Milton, Brampton, Cumbria
 Milton, Milnthorpe, Cumbria
 Milton, Derbyshire, a village in south Derbyshire
 Milton, Dorset, a former town
 Milton on Stour, Dorset
 Milton, a former hamlet in Westcliff-on-Sea, Essex
 Milton, Nottinghamshire
 Milton, Cherwell, Oxfordshire
 Milton, Vale of White Horse, Oxfordshire
 Milton Park, a business park
 Milton-under-Wychwood, Oxfordshire
 Milton, Portsmouth
 Milton, Somerset, hamlet in Ash parish, South Somerset
 Milton, North Somerset, an area of Weston-super-Mare, Somerset
 Milton, Staffordshire
 Milton, Wiltshire, a hamlet near East Knoyle
 Milton-next-Gravesend, an ecclesiastical parish in the north-west of Kent, England

Scotland 
 Milton (South Uist), in the Outer Hebrides
 Milton of Strathbogie, former name of Huntly, Aberdeenshire
 Milton of Finavon, Angus
 Milton of Ogilvie, Angus
 Milton of Campsie, East Dunbartonshire
 Milton, Easter Ross, a village near Kildary, Easter Ross, Highland
 Milton of Balgonie, Fife
 Milton, Glasgow, a district of the city
 Milton, Glenurquhart, a village near Drumnadrochit, Highland
 Milton, Stirling, a hamlet near Aberfoyle
 Milton of Buchanan, Stirling
 Milton, West Dunbartonshire, a village near Dumbarton

United States 
 Milton, California
 Milton, Delaware
 Milton, Florida
 Milton, Georgia
 Milton County, Georgia, a former county
 Milton, Illinois
 Milton, Indiana
 Milton, Ohio County, Indiana
 Milton, Iowa
 Milton, Kansas
 Milton, Kentucky
 Milton, Louisiana
 Milton, Maine
 Milton, Massachusetts
 Milton Academy, a preparatory school in Milton, Massachusetts
 Milton Township, Antrim County, Michigan
 Milton Township, Cass County, Michigan
 Milton Township, Dodge County, Minnesota
 Milton, Atchison County, Missouri
 Milton, Kansas City, Missouri
 Milton, Randolph County, Missouri
 Milton, New Hampshire
 Milton (CDP), New Hampshire, a census-designated place within the town
 Milton (town), New York, in Saratoga County
 Milton (CDP), Saratoga County, New York, a census-designated place within the town
 Milton, Ulster County, New York, a census-designated place and hamlet in Ulster County
 Milton, North Carolina
 Milton, North Dakota
 Milton Township, Ashland County, Ohio
 Milton Township, Wood County, Ohio
 Milton, Pennsylvania
 Milton, Tennessee
 Milton, Texas
 Milton, Vermont, a town
 Milton (CDP), Vermont, a census-designated place within the town
 Milton, Washington
 Milton, West Virginia
 Milton, Buffalo County, Wisconsin, a town
 Milton, Wisconsin, a city in Rock County
 Milton College, a former private college in Milton, Wisconsin
 Milton, Rock County, Wisconsin, a town surrounding the city

Other uses
Milton: A Poem in Two Books, an epic poem by William Blake
 Milton (album), a 1976 album by Milton Nascimento
Milton (cartoon), a series of cartoons for Saturday Night Live and the film Office Space
 Milton (crater), a crater on Mercury
Milton (game), an electronic game made in 1980 by Milton Bradley
Milton (horse), a show jumping horse ridden by John Whitaker
Milton (opera), by Gaspare Spontini
Milton Abbey School, Dorset, England
Milton Corporation, Australian investment company
Milton rail crash
Milton sterilizing fluid, a brand name of sterilising compound for purposes including baby bottles
Milton the Toaster, an advertising mascot for Pop-Tarts
Milton United F.C., a football club in Milton, Oxfordshire, England

See also
 Great Milton, Oxfordshire
 Little Milton, Oxfordshire
 Milltown (disambiguation)
 Milton Abbas, Dorset
 Milton Bryan, Bedfordshire
 Milton Center, Ohio
 Milton Clevedon, Somerset
 Milton Combe, Devon
 Milton Damerel, Devon
 Milton Ernest, Bedfordshire
 Milton-Freewater, Oregon
 Milton Green, Cheshire, a hamlet near Handley, Cheshire
 Milton Hall, an estate near Peterborough, Cambridgeshire
 Milton High School (disambiguation), various high schools
 Milton Keynes, Buckinghamshire
 Milton Lilbourne, Wiltshire
 Milton Malsor, Northamptonshire
 Milton-next-Gravesend, Kent
 Milton railway station (disambiguation)
 Milton Regis, Kent
 Milton Street, a hamlet in Long Man parish, East Sussex
 New Milton, Hampshire
 New Milton, West Virginia
 West Milton, Ohio